Middlesex County is located in the Commonwealth of Massachusetts, in the United States. As of the 2020 census, the population was 1,632,002, making it the most populous county in both Massachusetts and New England and the 22nd most populous county in the United States. Middlesex County is one of two U.S. counties (along with Santa Clara County, California) to be amongst the top 25 counties with the highest household income and the 25 most populated counties. It is included in the Census Bureau's Boston–Cambridge–Newton, MA–NH Metropolitan Statistical Area. As part of the 2020 United States census, the Commonwealth's mean center of population for that year was geo-centered in Middlesex County, in the town of Natick (this is not to be confused with the  geographic center of Massachusetts, which is in Rutland, Worcester County).

On July 11, 1997, Massachusetts abolished the executive government of Middlesex County primarily due to the county's insolvency. Middlesex County continues to exist as a geographic boundary but it is used primarily as district jurisdictions within the court system and for other administrative purposes; for example, as an election district. The National Weather Service weather alerts (such as severe thunderstorm warning) continue to localize based upon Massachusetts's counties.

History
The county was created by the Massachusetts General Court on May 10, 1643, when it was ordered that "the whole plantation within this jurisdiction be divided into four shires." Middlesex initially contained Charlestown, Cambridge, Watertown, Sudbury, Concord, Woburn, Medford, and Reading. In 1649 the first Middlesex County Registry of Deeds was created in Cambridge.

On April 19, 1775, Middlesex was site of the first armed conflict of the American Revolutionary War.

In 1855, the Massachusetts State Legislature created a minor Registry of Deeds for the Northern District of Middlesex County in Lowell.

In the late 19th century and early 20th century, Boston annexed several of its adjacent cities and towns including Charlestown and Brighton from Middlesex County, resulting in an enlargement and accretion toward Suffolk County.

Beginning prior to dissolution of the executive county government, the county comprised two regions with separate county seats for administrative purposes:
The Middlesex-North District (smaller) with its county seat in Lowell under the Registry of Deeds consisted of the city of Lowell, and its adjacent towns of Billerica, Carlisle, Chelmsford, Dracut, Dunstable, Tewksbury, Tyngsborough, Westford and Wilmington.
The Middlesex-South District (larger) with the county seat in Cambridge consisted of the remaining 44 cities and towns of Middlesex County.

Since the start of the 21st century much of the current and former county offices have physically decentralized from the Cambridge seat, with the sole exceptions being the Registry of Deeds and the Middlesex Probate and Family Court, which both retain locations in Cambridge and Lowell. Since the first quarter of 2008, the Superior Courthouse has been seated in the city of Woburn; the Sheriff's Office is now administratively seated in the city of Medford and the Cambridge-based County Jail has since been amalgamated with another county jail facility in Billerica.  The Cambridge District Court (which has jurisdiction for Arlington, Belmont and Cambridge); along with the Middlesex County District Attorney's Office, although not a part of the Middlesex County government, was also relatedly forced to relocate to Medford at the time of the closure of the Superior Courthouse building in Cambridge.

Law and government
Of the fourteen counties of Massachusetts, Middlesex is one of eight which have had no county government or county commissioners since July 1, 1998, when county functions were assumed by state agencies at local option following a change in state law. Immediately prior to its dissolution, the executive branch consisted of three County Commissioners elected at-large to staggered four-year terms. There was a County Treasurer elected to a six-year term. The county derived its revenue primarily from document filing fees at the Registries of Deeds and from a Deeds Excise Tax; also a transfer tax was assessed on the sale price of real estate and collected by the Registries of Deeds.

Budgets as proposed by the County Commissioners were approved by a County Advisory Board that consisted of a single representative of each of the 54 cities and towns in Middlesex County. The votes of the individual members of the Advisory Board were weighted based on the overall valuation of property in their respective communities.

The County Sheriff and two Registers of Deeds (one for the Northern District at Lowell and another for the Southern District at Cambridge) are each elected to serve six-year terms. Besides the employees of the Sheriff's Office and the two Registries of Deeds, the county had a Maintenance Department, a Security Department, some administrative staff in the Treasurer's and Commissioners' Offices, and the employees of the hospital.

The county government also owned and operated the Superior Courthouse, one of which was formerly in Cambridge (since 2008 relocated to Woburn.) and one in Lowell; and the defunct Middlesex County Hospital in the city of Waltham.

The legislation abolishing the Middlesex County executive retained the Sheriff and Registers of Deeds as independently elected officials, and transferred the Sheriff's Office under the state Department of Public Safety and the two Registry of Deeds offices to the Massachusetts Secretary of State's Office. Additionally, all county maintenance and security employees were absorbed into the corresponding staffs of the Massachusetts Trial Court. The legislation also transferred ownership of the two Superior Courthouses to the Commonwealth of Massachusetts. The hospital was closed. Finally, the office of County Commissioner was immediately abolished and the office of County Treasurer was abolished as of December 31, 2002. Any county roads transferred to the Commonwealth as part of the dissolution.  The other administrative duties (such as Sheriff, Department of Deeds and court system, etc.) and all supporting staff were transferred under the Commonwealth as well.

Administrative structure today
Records of land ownership in Middlesex County continue to be maintained at the two Registries of Deeds. Besides the Sheriff and the two Registers of Deeds, the Middlesex District Attorney, the Middlesex Register of Probate and the Middlesex Clerk of Courts (which were already part of state government before the abolition of Middlesex County government) are all elected countywide to six-year terms.

In Middlesex County (as in the entirety of the Commonwealth of Massachusetts), the governmental functions such as property tax assessment and collection, public education, road repair and maintenance, and elections were all conducted at the municipal city and town level and not by the county government.

In 2012 the 22-story Superior Court Building in Cambridge which was transferred from the abolished Executive County government was sold by the Commonwealth of Massachusetts. Due to its transfer from state control, many local residents had tried to force the private developers to reduce the overall height of the structure.

Even following abolition of the executive branch for county government in Middlesex, communities are still granted a right by the Massachusetts state legislature to form their own regional compacts for sharing of services and costs thereof.

Geography
It is the third-largest county in Massachusetts by land area.

It is bounded southeast by the Charles River, and drained by the Merrimack, Nashua, and Concord rivers, and other streams.

The MetroWest region comprises much of the southern portion of the county.

Adjacent counties
Hillsborough County, New Hampshire (north)
Essex County (northeast)
Suffolk County (southeast)
Norfolk County (south)
Worcester County (west)

Transportation
These routes pass through Middlesex County
, From Hopkinton to Newton
, From Somerville to Tewksbury
, From Newton to Wakefield 
, In Marlboro
, From Hopkinton to Tewksbury
, From Cambridge to Malden
/Route 3, From Cambridge to Tyngsborough
, From Marlborough to Watertown 
, From Littleton to Cambridge 
, From Shirley to Cambridge
, From Burlington to Tyngsborough 
, From Lexington-Arlington line to Chelmsford
, From Framingham to Newton 
, In Townsend 
, From Holliston to Everett
, From Sherborn to Chelmsford 
, From Cambridge to North Reading
, From Framingham to Newton 
, In Ashby
, From Somerville to Dracut
, From Groton to Chelmsford 
, From Waltham to Malden
, From Hudson to North Reading
, From Hopkinton to Hudson
, From Everett to Melrose
, From Ayer to Dracut
, From Concord to Pepperell 
, From Pepperell to Dracut
, In Sherborn
, From Stow to Waltham
, From Concord to Ashby 
, From Wilmington to North Reading 
, From Holliston to Concord
, From Newton to Wakefield
, From Chelmsford to Wakefield
, From Lowell to Tewksbury
, From Hopkinton to Natick
, From Shirley to Lexington

National protected areas
 Assabet River National Wildlife Refuge
 Great Meadows National Wildlife Refuge
 Longfellow House–Washington's Headquarters National Historic Site
 Lowell National Historical Park
 Minute Man National Historical Park
 Oxbow National Wildlife Refuge (part)

Demographics

, Middlesex County was tenth in the United States on the list of most millionaires per county.

As of the 2010 United States Census, there were 1,503,085 people, 580,688 households, and 366,656 families residing in the county. The racial makeup of the county was 80.0% white, 9.3% Asian, 4.7% black or African American, 0.2% American Indian, 3.3% from other races, and 2.5% from two or more races. Those of Hispanic or Latino origin made up 6.5% of the population.

The largest ancestry groups were:
 
23.5% Irish 
16.2% Italian
11.2% English
7.1% German
5.6% French
4.0% Polish
3.6% French Canadian
3.2% Chinese
3.1% Portuguese
2.9% American
2.7% Scottish
2.6% Russian
2.5% Indian
2.4% Brazilian
2.0% Scotch-Irish
2.0% Puerto Rican
1.7% Swedish
1.6% Greek
1.2% Sub-Saharan African
1.2% Haitian
1.2% Armenian
1.1% Canadian
1.0% Cambodian
1.0% Arab

Of the 580,688 households, 31.0% had children under the age of 18 living with them, 49.5% were married couples living together, 10.1% had a female householder with no husband present, 36.9% were non-families, and 27.8% of all households were made up of individuals. The average household size was 2.49 and the average family size was 3.10. The median age was 38.5 years.

The median income for a household in the county was $77,377 and the median income for a family was $97,382. Males had a median income of $64,722 versus $50,538 for females. The per capita income for the county was $40,139. About 5.1% of families and 7.6% of the population were below the poverty line, including 8.0% of those under age 18 and 8.0% of those age 65 or over.

79.6% spoke English, 4.3% Spanish, 2.7% Portuguese, 1.6% Italian, 1.6% Chinese including Mandarin and other Chinese dialects and 1.5% French as their first language.

Middlesex County has the largest Irish-American population of any U.S. county with a plurality of Irish ancestry.

Demographic breakdown by town

Income

The ranking of unincorporated communities that are included on the list are reflective if the census designated locations and villages were included as cities or towns. Data is from the 2007-2011 American Community Survey 5-Year Estimates.

Law enforcement

The primary responsibility of the Middlesex Sheriff's Office is oversight of the Middlesex House of Correction and Jail in Billerica. It formerly ran the Middlesex Jail in Cambridge, which closed on June 28, 2014. In addition, the Sheriff's Office operates the Office of Civil Process and, the Lowell Community Counseling Centers, and crime prevention and community service programs. The office of sheriff was created in 1692, making it one of the oldest law enforcement agencies in the United States. The sheriff is elected to a 6-year term.

Notable sheriffs include:

 Col. James Prescott (1775–1781)
 Col. Loammi Baldwin (1781–1794)
 Col. Samuel Chandler (1841–1851)
 Charles Kimball (1859–1879)
 John J. Buckley (1970–1980)
 John P. McGonigle (1985–1994)
 James DiPaola (1996–2010)
 John Granara (Special) (2010–2011)
 Peter Koutoujian  (2011–Present)

Politics

Prior to 1960, Middlesex County was a Republican Party stronghold, backing only two Democratic Party presidential candidates from 1876 to 1956. The 1960 election started a reverse trend, with the county becoming a Democratic stronghold. This has been even more apparent in recent years, with George H. W. Bush in 1988 being the last Republican presidential candidate to manage forty percent of the county's votes and Mitt Romney in 2012 being the last Republican presidential candidate to manage even thirty percent of the vote. In 2020, Joe Biden won 71% of the vote, the highest percent for any presidential candidate since 1964.

|}

Communities
Most municipalities in Middlesex County have a town form of government; the remainder are cities, and are so designated on this list. Villages listed below are census or postal divisions, but have no separate corporate or statutory existence from the cities and towns in which they are located.

Cities

Cambridge (traditional county seat) de jure
Everett
Framingham
Lowell (traditional county seat)
Malden
Marlborough
Medford
Melrose
Newton
Somerville
Waltham
Watertown
Woburn

Towns

Acton
Arlington
Ashby
Ashland
Ayer
Bedford
Belmont
Billerica
Boxborough
Burlington
Carlisle
Chelmsford
Concord
Dracut
Dunstable
Groton
Holliston
Hopkinton
Hudson
Lexington
Lincoln
Littleton
Maynard
Natick
North Reading
Pepperell
Reading
Sherborn
Shirley
Stoneham
Stow
Sudbury
Tewksbury
Townsend
Tyngsborough
Wakefield
Wayland
Westford
Weston
Wilmington
Winchester

Census-designated places

Ayer
Cochituate
Devens
East Pepperell
Groton
Hopkinton
Littleton Common
Pepperell
Pinehurst
Shirley
Townsend
West Concord

Other villages and neighborhoods

Auburndale
Chestnut Hill
East Lexington
Felchville
Forge Village
Gleasondale
Graniteville
Greenwood
Melrose Highlands
Nabnasset
Newton Centre
Newton Highlands
Newton Lower Falls
Newton Upper Falls
Newtonville
Nonantum
North Billerica
North Chelmsford
North Woburn
Pingryville
Saxonville
Thompsonville
Waban
West Newton

Education

School districts include:

K-12:

 Ayer-Shirley School District
 Acton-Boxborough Regional School District
 Arlington School District
 Ashland School District
 Bedford School District
 Belmont School District
 Billerica School District
 Burlington School District
 Cambridge Public School District
 Chelmsford School District
 Dracut School District
 Everett School District
 Framingham School District
 Groton-Dunstable School District
 Holliston School District
 Hopkinton School District
 Hudson School District
 Lexington School District
 Littleton School District
 Lowell Public Schools
 Malden School District
 Marlborough School District
 Maynard School District
 Medford Public Schools
 Melrose School District
 Nashoba School District
 Natick School District
 Newton School District
 North Middlesex School District
 North Reading School District
 Reading Public Schools
 Somerville School District
 Stoneham School District
 Tewksbury School District
 Tyngsborough School District
 Wakefield School District
 Waltham School District
 Watertown School District
 Wayland School District
 Westford School District
 Weston School District
 Wilmington School District
 Winchester School District
 Woburn School District

Secondary:
 Concord-Carlisle School District
 Dover-Sherborn School District
 Lincoln-Sudbury School District

Elementary:

 Carlisle School District
 Concord School District
 Lincoln School District
 Sherborn School District
 Sudbury School District

Tertiary institutions include:
 Harvard University (Cambridge)
 Massachusetts Institute of Technology (MIT) (Cambridge)

Culture
Middlesex County is home to the Middlesex County Volunteers, a fife and drum corps that plays music from the 17th, 18th, 19th and 20th centuries. Founded in 1982 at the end of the United States Bicentennial celebration, the group performs extensively throughout New England. They have also performed at the Boston Pops, throughout the British Isles and Western Europe, and at the Edinburgh Military Tattoo's Salute to Australia in Sydney, Australia.

See also

 Middlesex, historic county of England
 List of Massachusetts locations by per capita income
 Registry of Deeds (Massachusetts)
 National Register of Historic Places listings in Middlesex County, Massachusetts
 Middlesex Fells
 Middlesex Community College (Massachusetts)
 Middlesex Turnpike (Massachusetts)
 Middlesex County Sheriff's Office

Notes

References

Bibliography
  History of Middlesex County, Massachusetts, Volume 1 (A-H),  Volume 2 (L-W) by Samuel Adams Drake, published 1879 and 1880. 572 and 505 pages.
  Ancient Middlesex with Brief Biographical Sketches. By Levi Swanton Gould, published 1905, 366 pages.

Further reading
 
 Edwin P. Conklin, Middlesex County and Its People: A History. In Four Volumes. New York: Lewis Historical Pub. Co., 1927.
 Samuel Adams Drake,  History of Middlesex County, Massachusetts: Containing Carefully Prepared Histories of Every City and Town in the County. Boston: Estes and Lauriat, 1880. Volume 1 | Volume 2
 D. Hamilton Hurd, History of Middlesex County, Massachusetts: With Biographical Sketches of Many of its Pioneers and Prominent Men. In Three Volumes. Philadelphia, PA: J.W. Lewis & Co., 1890. Volume 1 | Volume 2 | Volume 3
 Robert H. Rodgers, Middlesex County in the Colony of the Massachusetts Bay in New England: Records of Probate and Administration, February 1670/71 – June 1676. Rockport, ME: Picton Press, 2005.

External links

 Middlesex County Sheriff's Department
 1856 Map of Middlesex County by Henry F. Walling
 Walling & Gray. 1871 Map of Middlesex County Plate 44-45 from the 1871 Atlas of Massachusetts.
 National Register of Historic Places listing for Middlesex Co., Massachusetts
 Middlesex County entry from Hayward's New England Gazetteer of 1839
 Map of cities and towns of Massachusetts 
 Massachusetts County Map
  History of Middlesex County by Samual Adams Drake, 1880. Contains histories of each town in the county.
 History of Middlesex County, Massachusetts With Biographical Sketches of Many of Its Pioneers and Prominent Men, edited by Duane Hamilton Hurd. J. W. Lewis & Co., Philadelphia. 1890.
 Middlesex North District Registry of Deeds
 Middlesex South District Registry of Deeds
 League of Women Voters, Massachusetts: County Government

 
Massachusetts counties
Counties in Greater Boston
1643 establishments in Massachusetts
Populated places established in 1643
1997 disestablishments in Massachusetts
Populated places disestablished in 1997